Torbjørn Rødland (born 1970) is a Norwegian photographic artist, whose images are saturated with symbolism, lyricism, and eroticism. His 2017 Serpentine Gallery solo exhibition was titled The Touch That Made You and travelled to the Fondazione Prada in Milan in 2018. His work was shown at the Venice Biennale of 1999. An early retrospective was held at the Astrup Fearnley Museum of Modern Art in Oslo in 2003.

Among public collections holding examples of his work are the Whitney Museum of American Art in New York City, the Museum of Modern Art in New York City, the Fonds national d'art contemporain in Paris, the Stedelijk Museum in Amsterdam, the Museum of Contemporary Art Chicago, and Moderna Museet in Stockholm.

Background and education 

Rødland lives and works in Los Angeles, California. He was born in 1970 in Stavanger, Norway. As a teenager, he freelanced for multiple Norwegian newspapers as an editorial cartoonist. Rødland studied Photography at the National College of Art and Design in Bergen (Norway) and cultural studies at the University of Stavanger.

Work 

Rødland's photographs are produced through film-based cameras and chemical processing. Art historian and critic Ina Blom has reflected in Artforum on the philosophical and cultural implications of his works: "The strangeness of these images might have triggered other intuitions—perhaps related to the question of what exactly it means to 'be' a photographic image amid a veritable surfeit of new-media technologies, environments, and objects." Wanting to push forward the artistic boundaries of his medium, Rødland has reconceptualized and integrated aesthetic qualities dismissed in postmodern art. Building on work by The Pictures Generation and Jeff Wall, Rødland's photography represents a surprising revaluation of lyricism and what he calls the sensuality of the photographic moment. Originally known for his portraits in Nordic landscapes, Rødland transcended this potential trope by consistently inventing new lures for viewers of his photographs. An example of these lures is the subtle co-existence of the twisted with the warm normalcy of his figures; as seen in his photograph of a woman's hand with an octopus tentacle creeping through her sleeve and wrapped around her fingers. Also a subtle symbol of nonduality, this image is characteristic of Rødland's work. His matter of factness, even in stylized imagery and multiple exposures, is what allows Rødland to straddle both the commonplace and the otherworldly. According to Rødland, "the struggle is to make the image active and relatable; clear but complex. Like our new reality, it has to be layered and open to paranoid interpretation." Or, as curator Bennett Simpson put it in an essay on Rødland, published in 2000: "His images are subjunctive; they operate under the yoke of a doubt, an impacted desire, the possibility of an impossibility."

Between 2004 and 2007 Rødland produced six video works. One of these, titled 132 BPM, was exhibited solo at MoMA PS1 (Long Island City) and at the Hiroshima City Museum of Contemporary Art (Hiroshima). In 2018 Rødland produced a new video work, titled Between Fork and Ladder, which appeared in his solo exhibition Fifth Honeymoon at Bergen Kunsthall (Bergen). The solo exhibition Fifth Honeymoon was presented again in 2019 at both Bonniers Konsthall (Sweden) as well as Museum of Contemporary Art Kiasma (Helsinki). Rødland's most recent video, Elegy for the Silent, was finished in 2020 and included in a solo exhibition at The Contemporary Austin titled Bible Eye in 2021.

Books 
Fifth Honeymoon, Sternberg Press / Bergen Kunsthall / Bonniers Konsthall / Kiasma Museum of Contemporary Art: Berlin / Bergen / Stockholm / Helsinki, 2018. 
 The Touch That Made You, Serpentine Galleries / Koenig Books: London, 2017.  
 The Model, MACK: London, October 2017. 
 Confabulations, MACK: London, June 2016. 
 Sasquatch Century, Mousse Publisher / Henie Onstad Art Center: Milano / Oslo, 2015.  
 Vanilla Partner, MACK: London, October 2012. 
 Andy Capp Variations, Hassla: New York, 2011. 
 A day in the life of.., Libraryman: Stockholm, 2009. 
 I Want to Live Innocent, SteidlMACK: Göttingen, February 2008. 
 White Planet, Black Heart, SteidlMACK: Göttingen, June 2006.

References

Further reading 

 Ngai, Sianne, “Rødland's Gimmick” Theory of the Gimmick: Aesthetic Judgement and Capitalist Form, The Belknap Press of Harvard University Press, June 2020.
 Andenæs, Morten, "Torbjørn Rødland". Objectiv June 2018
 Sholis, Brian, "Torbjørn Rødland". Aperture 221 November 2015
 Sholis, Brian, "Torbjørn Rødland". Frieze, Issue 173, August 2015.
 Johnson, Ken "Review: Torbjorn Rodland Mixes the Religious With the Evocative", The New York Times, June 12, 2015
 Gavin, Francesca, "Torbjørn Rødland." Dazed Digital, January 2013.
 TIME Photo Department, "TIME's Best of 2012: The Photo Books We Loved." TIME, December 2012.
 The Photo Department, "Our Top 10 Photo Books of 2012." New York Times Magazine, December 2012.
 Storm, Christian, "Visiting the Art Exhibits in Torbjørn Rødland's Dreams." Vice, November 2012.
 Rødland, Torbjørn, "Sentences on Photography." Triple Canopy, May 2011.
 Taft, Catherine, "Torbjørn Rødland at Michael Benevento." Artform, October 2010.
 Nickas, Bob, "The Perverted Photography of Torbjørn Rødland." Vice, January 2009.
 Lavalette, Shane, "Torbjørn Rødland in Conversation." Photo-Eye Magazine, October 2008. 
 Røed, Kjetil, “Books: I Want To Live Innocent.” Artreview, June 2008: Issue 23.
 Kessler, Sarah, “Torbjørn Rødland: Opposites Must Never Cease to Come Together.” Whitewall, April 2008.
 Blank, Gil, "Interview: Torbjørn Rødland." Uovo Magazine, March 2007.
 Herbert, Martin, "Profile: Torbjørn Rødland." Contemporary Magazine, September 2004.
 Fox, Dan, "Another Green World." Frieze, June–August 2001: Issue 60.

Norwegian photographers
Living people
1970 births
Norwegian contemporary artists
Norwegian expatriates in the United States
People from Stavanger
Bergen Academy of Art and Design alumni
University of Stavanger alumni